Jules et Jim is a musical collaboration consisting of Jean-Marc Lederman (of The Weathermen) and Julianne Regan (of All About Eve).

Discography

Singles
 Swimming CD1 (1999)
 "Swimming" (Single Edit) 
 "Only a Fool" (Underwater Mix)
 Swimming CD2 (1999)
 "Swimming" (Single Edit) 
 "Only a Fool" (Radio Mix) 
 "Swimming" (Plastic Boat Mix) 
 "Only a Fool" (Underwater Mix)

Lounge Musix I (promotional cd given away free with the fruit juices Looza)
 "Only a Fool" (Underwater Mix)
 "Infinity & Beyond" (Instrumental)
 "If Life Were a Movie" (Remix)
 "Sylvia" (Original Mix)

EPs
 Subtitles (2001)
 "If Life Were a Movie"
 "What Are the Chances?"
 "I Only Have Eyes for You"
 "It’s a Beautiful World"
 "Sylvia"
 "Queen Kerosene"

Albums
The above Subtitles and "Swimming" releases were also repackaged as a downloadable album on various online download music stores, except for the track "I Only Have Eyes for You":
 
Subtitles and More (2009)
 "Swimming"
 "If Life Were a Movie"
 "What are the Chances?"
 "Sylvia"
 "Only a Fool"
 "It’s a Beautiful World"
 "What are the Chances?" (Fairies Mix)
 "Swimming" (Plastic Boat Mix) 
 "Only a Fool" (Underwater Mix)
 "Queen Kerosene"
 
Then another re-release:

Synchronised (2019), as above with additional tracks:
 "Ms. Jones"
 "I Only Have Eyes for You" (re-added track)

Other releases
The band have also released a number of other tracks through their (now defunct) website:
 "What Are the Chances?" (Ballad Mix)
 "Brass" (Instrumental)
 "Laidback & the Kid" (Instrumental)

Collaborations
The duo have also collaborated on a number of other projects together.

Regan has contributed vocals to game soundtrack music composed by Lederman. Games include Mystic Inn, Fairies and Kudos: Rock Legend.
The soundtrack from Fairies was released as a downloadable single with the following tracks:
"Fairies Theme" 
"The Castle"
"The Forest"
"Time" 
"The Plains"
"Zen"
"Chances EMO"

Their most recent collaboration is on Lederman's La Femme Verte covers project. Regan has contributed vocals to a number of tracks on the album Small Distortions (original recording artists in brackets):
"Hurt" (Nine Inch Nail)
"Falling" (Angelo Badalamenti/Julee Cruise) 
"Moonlight Mile" (Rolling Stones)
"Being Boring" (Pet Shop Boys)
"Monday Monday" (The Mamas & the Papas)

And other later collaborations:

"Dreams Are All Faded Away", on the Jean-Marc Lederman Experience album The Last Broadcast on Earth.
"Triskaidekaphobia", spoken track on the Jean-Marc Lederman Experience album 13 Ghost Stories.
Four ambient tracks on the EP Music to Relax to While You Struggle Under a Tory Government, under the band name Glassko & Fayzer.

References

External links
Official site
La Femme Verte
Lederman's own site
Unofficial but sanctioned site
Review of Subtitles
Discography 
Interview

Electronic music duos